The Northern German football championship (German: Norddeutsche Fußballmeisterschaft), operated by the Northern German Football Association (German: Norddeutscher Fußball-Verband (NFV), was the highest association football competition in Northern Germany, in the Prussian provinces of Schleswig-Holstein and Hanover and the German states of Hamburg, Lübeck, Mecklenburg-Schwerin, Mecklenburg-Strelitz, Oldenburg, Bremen and the Duchy of Brunswick. The regional associations, including the NFV, were dissolved in 1933 and the competition was not held again until 1946.

Overview
German football was, from its beginnings, divided into regional associations, each of which carried out their own championship matches.  These often pre-dated the national German championship. With the inception of the latter in 1903, the former became qualifying tournaments.  Regional championships still held a high value for the local clubs. The most important of these regional championships were:
 Southern German football championship - formed in 1898
 Brandenburg football championship - formed in 1898
 Central German football championship - formed in 1902
 Western German football championship - formed in 1903
 March football championship - existed from 1903 to 1911
 Northern German football championship - formed in 1906
 South Eastern German football championship - formed in 1906
 Baltic football championship - formed in 1908

Regional championships were suspended with the rise of the Nazis to power in 1933. At the end of the Second World War, some resumed, but in league format. In the North, a championship had been started in the summer of 1946 but it had to be stopped during the quarter-finals when the British Military Government intervened. Subsequently, the Oberliga Nord was established in 1947. Others, such as the Baltic championship, completely disappeared because the territories they were held in were no longer part of Germany. With the South West German football championship, a new regional competition also appeared in 1945 in the French Zone. Ultimately, with the formation of the Bundesliga, regional championships ceased altogether.

History

Background
When the Northern German championship was established in 1906, the region of Northern Germany (German: Norddeutschland) was politically divided into a number of territories, the first two being part of the Kingdom of Prussia:
 Province of Hanover
 Province of Schleswig-Holstein
 Bremen 
 Duchy of Brunswick
 Hamburg
 Lübeck
 Grand Duchy of Mecklenburg-Strelitz
 Grand Duchy of Mecklenburg-Schwerin
 Grand Duchy of Oldenburg

With the defeat of the German Empire in 1918 and the formation of a Republic, the former Kingdoms and Principalities became states. For the two Prussian provinces, this only meant that the Kingdom was replaced with the Free State of Prussia, while the Free Cities remained as they were. The former Principalities became free states:
 Province of Hanover
 Province of Schleswig-Holstein
 Bremen 
 Free State of Brunswick
 Hamburg
 Lübeck
 Free State of Mecklenburg-Strelitz
 Free State of Mecklenburg-Schwerin
 Free State of Oldenburg
All this, however, was not really relevant in the field of football because from the start, most regional associations ignored Länder (state) boundaries and established themselves within reasonable geographic regions (e.g. there was never a Prussian Football Federation). The very first federation in the North, inaugurated in 1894, incorporated clubs from Hamburg (Free Hanseatic City) as well as Altona and Wandsbek (both of which were Prussian). This policy was encouraged after the foundation of Deutscher Fußball-Bund (DFB) in 1900 and maintained throughout Germany although the regional federations were later called Landesverbände (state associations) which they weren't.

Football association
The Northern German Football Association (NFV, see above) was formed on 15 April 1905, thereby in cooperating six regional associations:
 Hamburg-Altonaer Fussball Bund - formed 20 October 1894
 Verband Bremer Ballspielvereine - 1 April 1899
 Verband Kieler Ballspielvereine - 25 February 1903
 Hannoverscher Assoziations-Verband - 1 July 1903
 Fussballbund für das Herzogtum Braunschweig - 7 May 1904
 Mecklenburger Fussball-Verband - 18 December 1904

Two others could not, or did not, join as the
 Fussball Verband an der Unterweser - 14 March 1900
was defunct at the time whereas the clubs in the
 Verband Hannoverscher Fussball-Vereine - 1 July 1903
played Rugby.

Competition

1906 to 1914
The Northern German football championship was first contested in 1906 and won by Victoria Hamburg. Six clubs had qualified and the final stages were held as a knock-out competition with a one-off final at the end. The winner of this first competition then took part in the fourth edition of the national German championship. Northern German clubs had already taken part in each of the previous three national championships.

To qualify for the Northern German championship, a club had to take out the title in its local or district competition or league. This remained unchanged through 1920 (with the one exception of the 1913–14 season) but, as more football clubs were formed in Germany and the NFV grew bigger, the number of its districts increased and thereby also the numbers of clubs taking part in the Northern championship.

The second edition was played out in the same modus but now with eight clubs, a system that remained in place for the following seasons. The northern champions experienced some first national success in 1910, when Holstein Kiel reached the German final, to lose 1–0 to Karlsruher FV. In 1912, the Holstein returned to the national final once more and became the first northern club to win it, this time beating Karlsruher FV 1–0.

In its last pre-First World War season, 1914, the competition became a regional league (Verbandsliga Norddeutschland or Norddeutsche Liga). Ten clubs played a home-and-away season to determine the northern champions, an unusual concentration of clubs in one league for Germany at the time, where leagues were very much sub-regional, with regional leagues existing in Brandenburg but nowhere else.

1914 to 1918
In 1914–15, football in Germany had come to an almost complete halt. As it became clear, that the war would last longer than anticipated, local competitions restarted in 1915. In most regions of Germany, like the South, the championships were restarted from 1915 onwards but in the North, this was not so. A northern championship was played in 1916 again, but only for selections, not clubs. In 1917, a club championship was played once more but in 1918, the competition returned to selections rather than clubs.

1919 to 1933
The Northern German championship resumed in 1919, as a knockout competition, with eleven clubs, enlarged to twelve the year after.

In 1921, the competition returned to a league format. Two divisions, a northern and a southern, with ten clubs each, played a home-and-away format. The two divisional champions then played for the northern championship in a two-leg final. The competition was, for the first time, won by a new force in German football, the Hamburger SV. The club became the most dominating team in the competition from then on, also reaching the national final in 1922, 1923, 1924 and 1928. In 1923 and 1928, it won the championship, in 1922, no champions was determined and only in 1924 did the club actually lose the finals game. Apart from HSV, only Holstein Kiel could achieve success in the north, reaching the German final for a third time in 1930 but losing to Hertha BSC Berlin.

The Northern German championship changed its system to determine the champion once more in 1922, when seven clubs played a league format with a single round only. In 1923, a knock-out format was used once more, in 1924, five clubs played a championship round.

From then on, league formats were used, where every club met the other only once, with varying numbers of clubs involved, four in 1929, 1930, 1931, 1932, 1933, five in 1924, 1926, 1927, six in 1925 and seven in 1928. From 1925, the German championship was enlarged and the runners-up of Northern Germany were also qualified for the national competition.

Aftermath
The Northern German championship was replaced with two regional Gauligen by the Nazis in 1933, the Gauliga Niedersachsen and Gauliga Nordmark. In the era that followed, the clubs from Northern Germany saw only limited success in the national finals, Hannover 96 taking out the title in 1938 and the German Luftwaffe team LSV Hamburg losing the 1944 final against Dresdner SC.

After the end of the Second World War, Germany remained divided until 1991 and the new Oberliga Nord, formed in 1947, became the replacement for the old Northern German championship. It did, however, not include the clubs from Mecklenburg any more as those now became part of the East German football league system.

Northern German football champions

Winners and runners-up of the Oberliga Nord (1947–63)
The Oberliga Nord, formed in 1947, is considered to be a continuation of the Northern German football championship. It only included teams from West Germany and was disbanded with the introduction of the Fußball-Bundesliga in 1963. This event marked the end of the Northern German football championship.

 Bold Denotes team went on to win German Championship.

Further reading
 Stürmen für Deutschland: Die Geschichte des deutschen Fussballs von 1933, publisher: Campus Verlag

References

Sources
 Fussball-Jahrbuch Deutschland  (8 vol.), Tables and results of the German tier-one leagues 1919-33, publisher: DSFS
 Kicker Almanach,  The yearbook on German football from Bundesliga to Oberliga, since 1937, published by the Kicker Sports Magazine

External links
 The Gauligas Das Deutsche Fussball Archiv  
 German league tables 1892-1933 Hirschi's Fussball seiten 
 Germany - Championships 1902-1945 at RSSSF.com

Defunct football competitions in Germany
German football championship
1906 establishments in Germany
1933 disestablishments in Germany
Football competitions in Bremen (state)
Football competitions in Hamburg
Football competitions in Lower Saxony
Football competitions in Mecklenburg-Western Pomerania
Football competitions in Schleswig-Holstein